Coppage v. Kansas, 236 U.S. 1 (1915), was a Supreme Court of the United States case based on United States labor law that allowed employers to implement contracts—called yellow-dog contracts—which forbade employees from joining unions.

The case was decided in the era prior to the Great Depression, when the Supreme Court invalidated laws that imposed restrictions on contracts, especially those of employment. The liberty of contract became viewed as a fundamental right that could be abridged only in extreme circumstances; abridgments violate the Due Process Clause of the Fourteenth Amendment.

Background
Coppage, an employer, forbade his employees from joining labor unions by making it part of their contract, which the employee signed before being hired. That violated a Kansas law that prohibited such contracts.

Decision
The majority opinion was written by Justice Pitney. It held that the law prohibiting such contracts violated Coppage's due process rights, as the government did not have a responsibility to prevent inequality of bargaining power:

He concluded that a state in the exercise of its police power did not have the right to redress imbalances of bargaining power and that requiring a man to give up the right to be in a union as a condition of employment does "not to ask him to give up any part of his constitutional freedom."

Dissents
Justice Holmes wrote a dissent in which he called again for Lochner to be overruled and stated that the Constitution does not specifically prohibit a law like the one Kansas had and so it should be upheld:

Justice Day's dissent would have affirmed the liberty of contract against arbitrary legislative restraints but deferred more to the legislature on the question of whether the law upheld the public welfare. He also argued, "A man may not barter away his life or his freedom, or his substantial rights."

See also
US labor law
List of United States Supreme Court cases, volume 236

Further reading

External links

United States Supreme Court cases
United States Supreme Court cases of the White Court
1915 in United States case law
History of labor relations in the United States
United States substantive due process case law
1915 in the United States
United States labor case law